The Ghendtsche Post-Tydinghen was initially a weekly (and later a twice-weekly) newspaper published in Ghent from 1667 to 1722.

Publication history
The newspaper was founded by Maximiliaan Graet, printer to the city of Ghent, in 1667, and remained a family business, run by his widow and their descendants, until it folded in 1722.

References
 Theo Luyckx, "De eerste gazettiers en hun kranten in de Spaanse Nederlanden", Handelingen der Koninklijke Zuidnederlandse Maatschappij voor Taal- en Letterkunde en Geschiedenis 18 (1963): 231-256.
 Sien Uytterschout & Marianne Van Remoortel, "The Flemish Connection: Socio-Cultural News from London in the Ghendtsche Post-tydingen (1667–1723)", English Studies 92/5 (2001), Special Issue: Intellectual Entrepôts and Cultural Exchange between the Low Countries and England in the Seventeenth Century, pp. 537-547
 E. Voordeckers, Bijdrage tot de geschiedenis van de Gentse pers. Repertorium (1667–1914) (Leuven and Paris, 1964), 236-238.

External links
 Digitized editions and library holdings on Abraham. Belgian Newspaper Catalogue.

Dutch-language newspapers published in Belgium
History of Ghent
Publications established in 1667
Publications disestablished in 1722
1722 disestablishments in the Habsburg monarchy
1722 disestablishments in the Holy Roman Empire
Disestablishments in the Austrian Netherlands
1667 establishments in the Habsburg Netherlands
Defunct newspapers published in Belgium
Mass media in Ghent